= Instabox =

Swedish logistics company

Instabox is a Swedish logistics company founded in 2010. The company currently has operations in Sweden, Norway, Denmark and Netherlands.

The company received lots of attention in 2021 after its rapid expansion and, in 2022, received ninth place on the Financial Times yearly list of Europe's fastest growing companies revenue-wise based on the period between 2017 and 2020.
